Joseph James Lawson (born 3 June 1934 – 13 September 2020) is a former Australian rules footballer who was highly successful in the West Australian National Football League (WANFL) playing for the Swan Districts Football Club.

A valiant defender, Lawson routinely played in the back line and was arguably the best full back that ever played for Swan Districts. Lawson won the fairest and best award at the Swans in 1958 and also played as a reserve in the 1959 WA state team when Western Australia were defeated by Victoria.

He played at full back the victorious Swan Districts premiership side of 1961, 1962 and 1963 and was amongst the best players on ground. Lawson is a life member at Swan Districts and is listed at full back in their Team of the Century.

References

1934 births
2020 deaths
Swan Districts Football Club players
Australian rules footballers from Western Australia